RRQ may refer to:

Réseau de Résistance du Québécois, Quebec nationalist group
Rock and Roller Queens, roller derby league from Bogotá, Colombia
Rex Regum Qeon, Indonesian based esports organization